The Insurance Hall of Fame, occasionally referred to as the International Insurance Hall of Fame, honors exceptional members of the insurance field. It was created in 1957 and is administered by the global nonprofit International Insurance Society (IIS), which was founded in 1965 and is based in New York City. 

The Insurance Hall of Fame's museum and portrait gallery at the University of Alabama houses a collection of portraits and memorabilia of the laureates. A multimedia collection of laureate portraits, videos, and biographies are also housed in a gallery at St. John's University in New York City.

To qualify for inclusion in the Insurance Hall of Fame, nominees must be adjudged to have made a lasting contribution to the insurance industry. They also may have shown creative thinking and imaginative actions – starting trends, discovering new products or methods, or uncovering and resolving problems.

Each year a selection of candidates deemed to fulfill the Insurance Hall of Fame awards criteria is nominated by the Honors Nominating Committee of the International Insurance Society and selected by the IIS Executive Council. The International Insurance Society may also elect an individual posthumously.

History
The Insurance Hall of Fame was conceived and organized in 1957 by John S. Bickley, who was then professor of insurance at Ohio State University. It was sponsored by the Griffith Foundation for Insurance Education, which had its headquarters on the OSU campus. The Griffith Foundation for Insurance Education is a nonprofit educational corporation founded in 1947 at Ohio State University in memory of a young Columbus, Ohio insurance agent, Charles W. Griffith, who was killed in World War II; the foundation was affiliated with OSU until 1992. 

Bickley, who continued to spearhead the Insurance Hall of Fame as its Chairman, later moved to the University of Texas, and then to the University of Alabama, where he had started his academic career.

In 1965 the Insurance Hall of Fame became international, appointing electors from 32 countries and voting on candidates from anywhere in the world. That year Bickley founded the International Insurance Society (IIS), based in New York City, as a forum where people involved in insurance could share their ideas and interests.  The IIS encourages networking, academic pursuits, and education; it sponsors annual meetings, and funds research projects and awards. A committee of insurance industry leaders at IIS annually elects the inductees to the Insurance Hall of Fame – those who have made notable contributions to the insurance industry worldwide. As of 2019 the IIS includes electors from over 90 countries.

In 1987 the Insurance Hall of Fame's museum and portrait gallery moved to the University of Alabama, where Bickley taught. Space at the New York City-based International Insurance Society is too limited to display any but the current year's inductees. By 2010 the museum in Alabama had drawn over 250,000 visitors. The facility includes a portrait gallery of inductees through the years, a museum of insurance, and a lecture hall. 

In 2003 an additional gallery was opened at St. John's University in New York City, which hosts a multimedia collection of laureate portraits, videos, and biographies. In 2004 the Insurance Hall of Fame launched its website, with lists and profiles of all inductees since its inception.

Nominees for the Insurance Hall of Fame are submitted by the IIS membership and evaluated for selection by the IIS Honors Committee, a body of senior insurance executives and academics. The nominees are then voted on by the IIS membership by secret ballot, which is tabulated and conducted by an independent auditing firm.

Insurance Hall of Fame laureates
Data is from Insurance Hall of Fame Laureates by Year of Induction.

1950s

1957
Elizur Wright - USA
Solomon S. Huebner - USA
Benjamin Franklin - USA

1958
Charles Evans Hughes - USA
Ralph H. Blanchard - USA

1959
Frederick H. Ecker - USA
Albert F. Dean - USA

1960s

1960
M. Albert Linton - USA
John A. Diemand, Sr. - USA

1961
Clarence Arthur Kulp - USA
Louis I. Dublin - USA

1962
John Marshall Holcombe, Jr. - USA
Alfred M. Best - USA

1963
Julian S. Myrick - USA
Sheppard Homans - USA

1964
William Leslie, Sr. - USA

1965
Ernst Froelich - Switzerland
Haley Fiske - USA
James Dodson - United Kingdom
Johan DeWitt - Netherlands
James G. Batterson - USA
Nicholas Barbon - United Kingdom

1966
Alfred Manes - Germany
Holgar J. Johnson - USA
Cuthbert Eden Heath - United Kingdom

1967
William David Winter - USA
Georges Tattevin - France
Edmond Halley - United Kingdom
Alfred N. Guertin - USA
Leighton Foster - Canada

1968
Arthur Hunter - USA
Joseph Arnould - India
Zachariah Allen - USA

1969
Charles J. Zimmerman - USA
Harry J. Loman - USA
Max E. Eisenring - Switzerland

1970s

1970
Tsuneta Yano - Japan
James Scott Kemper, Sr. - USA
Kenkichi Kagami - Japan
Hendon Chubb - USA
John Julius Angerstein - United Kingdom

1971
John F. Dryden - USA
Paul F. Clark - USA
Alios Alzheimer - Germany

1972
David McCahan - USA
Walter Arnold Dinsdale - United Kingdom

1973
Maurice Picard - France
Albert Henry Mowbray - USA

1974
Richard Price - United Kingdom
Cecil Edward Golding - United Kingdom
Harald Cramer - Sweden
Eugenio Artom - Italy

1975
Cornelius V. Starr - USA
Murray D. Lincoln - USA
J. Roger Hull - USA
Jacques Basyn - Belgium

1976
Otto von Bismarck - Germany
Edwin W. Patterson - USA
Gen Hirose - Japan

1978
Taizo Abe - Japan

1979
Herbert W. Heinrich - USA
Henry S. Beers - USA

1980s

1980
Joseph B. Maclean - USA
Andre Besson - France

1981
Antigono Donati - Italy

1982
Haruo Murase - Japan

1983
Ikunoshin Kadono - Japan

1984
B. K. Shah - India
Benjamin Rush - USA

1985
S. Bruce Black - USA

1986
Robert E. Dineen - USA
Jean-Baptiste Colbert - France

1987
Victor Dover - United Kingdom
Jorge Bande - Chile

1988
Alex Möller - Germany
John S. Bickley - USA
Robert A. Beck - USA

1989
Edwin S. Overman - USA
Maurice R. Greenberg - USA

1990s

1990
Douglas A. Barlow - Canada

1991
Alfred H. Pollard - Australia
Horst K. Jannott - Germany

1992
John E. Fisher - USA

1993
C. Arthur Williams - USA
Kenneth Black - USA

1994
Davis W. Gregg - USA

1995
Ronald M. Hubbs - USA
Willem de Wit - Netherlands

1996
Yong Ho Shin - South Korea
Robert F. McDermott - USA

1997
Alfonso Yuchengco - Philippines
Saburo Kawai - Japan

1998
Thomas Bassett Macaulay - Canada
José Maria De Delas Y Miralles - Spain
Hans Bühlmann - Switzerland

1999
George J. Mecherle - USA
Edwin A. G. Manton - USA
Claude Bébéar - France

2000s

2000
Jose Pinera - Chile
Hans Gerling - Germany

2001
Josei Itoh - Japan
Leo Goodwin, Sr. - USA
James C. H. Anderson - USA

2002
Lutgart Van den Berghe - Belgium
Aad Jacobs - Netherlands
Edison L. Bowers -  USA

2003
Edmund Tse - Hong Kong
Clemente Cabello P. - Mexico

2004
Kees J. Storm - Netherlands
Takeo Inokuchi - Japan
Per M. Hansson - Norway

2005
William Meredith - Canada
Walter Kielholz - Switzerland
Ignacio Hernando de Larramendi - Spain

2006
Siegfried Sellitsch - Austria
Orio Giarini - Italy

2007
Frederic Reiss - Bermuda
José Manuel Martínez - Spain
Robert Clements - USA

2008
Patrick G. Ryan - USA
Professor G. S. Diwan - India
Dominic D'Alessandro - Canada

2009
Sir David Rowland - United Kingdom
Jack Byrne - USA

2010s

2010
Frank O'Halloran - Australia
William C. Greenough - USA

2011
Brian Duperreault - USA
Guy Carpenter - USA

2012
Ikuo Uno - Japan
Manuel Povoas - Brazil

2013
Robert Benmosche - USA

2014
Robert Kiln - United Kingdom
Denis Kessler - France

2015
Stephen Catlin - United Kingdom

2016
Donald Kramer - USA

2017
Nikolaus von Bomhard - Germany

2018
Shuzo Sumi - Japan

2019
Michael A. Butt - Bermuda

2020
Larry Zimpleman - USA

2021
Greig Woodring - USA

References

External links
Official website
Insurance Hall of Fame at Vimeo

Halls of fame in Alabama
University of Alabama
1957 establishments in Ohio
1965 establishments in New York City
1987 establishments in Alabama
History of insurance
Businesspeople halls of fame
Awards established in 1957